International Law is a Canadian documentary television miniseries on international law which aired on CBC Television in 1961.

Premise
This series concerned the various aspects of international law with such examples as the International Court of Justice, the Nuremberg Trials, and external interventions in domestic conflicts. Episodes featured a panel of academic and judicial experts to discuss the issues raised.

Scheduling
This half-hour series was broadcast on Sundays at 5:30 p.m. (Eastern) from 27 August to 1 October 1961.

Episodes
 27 August 1961: territorial waters
 3 September 1961: intervention
 10 September 1961: individual rights and responsibilities
 17 September 1961: International Court of Justice
 24 September 1961: Nuremberg trials (part 1)
 1 October 1961: Nuremberg trials (part 2)

References

External links
 

CBC Television original programming
1961 Canadian television series debuts
1961 Canadian television series endings
1960s Canadian documentary television series